Jack Change It is a simple card game of the Crazy Eights family that is popular among children. It is usually played by two to six players, although theoretically it can be played with up to ten. This game is a shedding-type card game, the purpose being for a player to be the first to discard all of their cards. Jack Change It appears to be the same game as Jacks, Twos and Eights.

Basic game
Using a standard deck, seven cards are dealt to each player to create their hand. The remaining cards form the "deck", which players will use to draw their new cards. The top card is turned face up beside the deck to form the "pile". The object of the game is for one player to be the first to discard their hand entirely by placing a card on top of the pile on each of their turns. Some games allow that more than one card can be played at a time, under specific circumstances. Typically the game ends when one player wins, although some games continue until there is only one player left.

The player to the left of the dealer plays first. A player plays a card by placing it on top of the pile, but only if it matches either the Suit or the Rank of the top card. If the player cannot play a card on this turn, then they "pick up" a card from the deck. When there are no more cards in the deck, the top pile card is removed and placed to the side, and the remaining cards are shuffled to form a new deck, and the game resumes.

Also when a player is on their last card they need to say "knock knock last card" (may actually knock) another player can call them out for this before they play their last card making them pick up one card. Similarly, a player can call someone out for being "stupid" which is when they play out of turn or play on a trick card directed at them, this also means they pick up a varying number may be one or seven.

Several Ranks of cards, most importantly the Jack, have specific effects when they are played. These are normally referred to as "trick cards". Which Ranks count as trick cards, and their effects, can vary between games and players. Typically a player cannot finish a game using a trick card.

Trick cards
There are many variations on trick cards, often with different effects and "House Rules". Below are some of the more common rules, but some games can be played with less cards taking their effects, or more. Some games also may change a cards effect based on its suit, or what it was played on.

These rules can vary greatly, and should be agreed upon at the start of the game.

There are also differing rules on when a trick card can be played e.g. at any time, or only when it matches the suit or rank of the card on top of the pile.

A player cannot start on any of the cards listed below, and a general rule is that a game cannot end on a trick card. There are variations on this, e.g. in the case of a Queen, which can sometimes be used to finish when only two players are participating, or the King of Hearts, which may only have a trick card effect if its played on the Ace of Hearts. Some games also allow that if a player has a pair of the same rank, they can play both at once. Again, these rules tend to change depending on the players, and should be agreed before the game begins.

Ace of Hearts
This is regarded as the most powerful card in the game. The next player in the order will have to pick up five cards from the deck at the beginning of, or in place of, their turn. But may be blocked by a five of hearts, or 2 of hearts or in some variations an Ace of spades. If you use a 2 of hearts, it will make the next person pick up seven. Unless the rule variation allows another 2 to be played chaining it.

2
When a 2 of any Suit is played, the next player in the order has to pick up two cards before they begin their turn. Some games allow that this can be "chained" by the next player playing another 2, meaning the next player in the order must pick up four cards. This can continue until all the twos are played and a player has to pick up 8. A 2 is the only card that can pass on the obligation to pick up 2, unless the final 2 that is played is the 2 of hearts then the next player only has to pick up 2.

8
When an 8 of any Suit is played, the next player misses their turn; play passes to the following player. Some games allow that the player only misses their turn if they themselves do not have an 8. If they play an 8, they do this instead of missing their turn.

Some games allow that the effect of the 8 cards can carry over e.g. if a player places an 8 on the pile, and the next player places another 8 on the pile to block this, the third player will then miss two turns instead of one, or the next two players miss their turn. May be announced by saying "eighter wait." which is a play on the words eight or wait. 

Other Variations make the Eight change the direction and the Sevens make the next player miss a go. when sevens are used and a person misses their go its called Knocked

Jack
When a Jack is played, the player can choose the next suit of card to be played, usually by claiming "Jack change it to..." This is where the game gets its name. Different House Rules allow for different conditions of the Jack's effect.

One rule is that a Jack can only be played on a suit that it matches, but can change to any suit.
Another variation is that the Jack can be played on any suit, but changes to the suit of the Jack.
And another variation is that the Jack can be played on any suit, and can change to any suit.

Regardless, it is generally accepted that the Jack cannot block the effect of another trick card e.g. the 8 or the 2.

Queen
When a Queen of any Suit is played, the order of play is reversed. The player to the right will take the next turn, and play continues in this fashion until another Queen is played. May be announced by saying "queen reverse" In a two player game, the Queen's effect if usually ignored as the play order cannot be changed.

And alternative rule is that in a two player game, the Queen acts as an 8, and causes the opposing player to miss a turn. In some variations the King or the seven of diamonds may act as a queen does and reverse play.

Ace
This card allows a person to play again, and would be announced by saying "ace return into a...". This can be chained, and affects all aces but ace of hearts. however this is a rare variation.

Some variations on the ace make it like the jack in the most common rules. In these variations the Jack usually only changes to the suite of the Jack played. Other variations have it act as a plus one which can only be passed on with an ace but the effects don't stack so it is still a plus 1.

Further Variations
The number of starting cards can vary from the normal seven, usually still an odd number such as five or nine. Using five cards allows more players, while nine cards allows two or three players a longer game.

As stated above, the end condition of the game can sometimes be different. Usually there is one winner, and the game ends when they have discarded their hand, but some games allow that the game continues until there is only one remaining player. This means there is one loser, rather than one winner. 

The king may also be a trick card which allows the user to request a card by saying "King calling on..." If nobody has that card it continues round till it returns to the user of the king or another king is played.

The 3 may also be a trick card which acts as a 2 but the next player picks up 3 instead of 2. This can't be chained with another 3 or a 2.

It is considered good gamesmanship and gentlemanly to display your 3's to the other players at the table. Finishing on a 3, which is known as a "Gentleman's Finish", should arouse a hurrah around the table. The 3 has no new effect and is not considered a special card. This can be used as a variation if the 3 is not already being used as a trick card.

Strategy
Players can try to hold on to their trick cards until needed because if they are used early, the opponent can tell if the player has any trick cards to block any moves. This can be risky, however, as most versions of the rules state that the game cannot end on a trick card. 

Another strategy involves the choice a player makes when claiming "Jack change it to...". If the player in question has only a few remaining cards, and they've chosen Hearts (as an example), it may then be obvious to the table that this player has mostly (or exclusively) Heart cards remaining in their hand. The other players may then try to sabotage this player by deliberately changing the active suit to something else. 

Fishing card games
Shedding-type card games
Card games for children